In linear algebra, Cramer's rule is an explicit formula for the solution of a system of linear equations with as many equations as unknowns, valid whenever the system has a unique solution. It expresses the solution in terms of the determinants of the (square) coefficient matrix and of matrices obtained from it by replacing one column by the column vector of right-sides of the equations. It is named after Gabriel Cramer (1704–1752), who published the rule for an arbitrary number of unknowns in 1750, although Colin Maclaurin also published special cases of the rule in 1748 (and possibly knew of it as early as 1729).

Cramer's rule implemented in a naive way is computationally inefficient for systems of more than two or three equations. In the case of  equations in  unknowns, it requires computation of  determinants, while Gaussian elimination produces the result with the same computational complexity as the computation of a single determinant. Cramer's rule can also be numerically unstable even for 2×2 systems. However, it has recently been shown that Cramer's rule can be implemented with the same complexity as Gaussian elimination, (consistently requires twice as many arithmetic operations and has the same numerical stability when the same permutation matrices are applied).

General case
Consider a system of  linear equations for  unknowns, represented in matrix multiplication form as follows:

where the  matrix  has a nonzero determinant, and the vector  is the column vector of the variables. Then the theorem states that in this case the system has a unique solution, whose individual values for the unknowns are given by:

A more general version of Cramer's rule considers the matrix equation

Then

In the case , this reduces to the normal Cramer's rule.

The rule holds for systems of equations with coefficients and unknowns in any field, not just in the real numbers.

Proof
The proof for Cramer's rule uses the following properties of the determinants: linearity with respect to any given column and the fact that the determinant is zero whenever two columns are equal, which is implied by the property that the sign of the determinant flips if you switch two columns.

Fix the index  of a column, and consider that the entries of the columns have fixed values. This makes the determinant a function of the entries of the th column. Linearity with respect of this column means that this function has the form 

So, one has 

(Laplace expansion provides a formula for computing the  but their expression is not important here.) 

If one combines these equations by taking  times the first equation, plus  times the second, and so forth until  times the last, then, for every  the coefficient of  becomes
 
So, all coefficients become zero, except the coefficient of  that becomes  Similarly, the constant coefficient becomes  and the resulting equation is thus

The only point that remains to prove is that these values for the unknowns form a solution. Expressed in matrix terms, we have thus to prove that 

is a solution; that is, that 

For that, it suffices to prove that 

where  is the identity matrix.

The above properties of the functions  show that one has , and therefore,

This completes the proof, since a left inverse of a square matrix is also a right-inverse (see Invertible matrix theorem).

For other proofs, see below.

Finding inverse matrix

Let  be an  matrix with entries in a field . Then

In fact, this formula works whenever  is a commutative ring, provided that  is a unit. If  is not a unit, then  is not invertible over the ring (it may be invertible over a larger ring in which some non-unit elements of  may be invertible).

Applications

Explicit formulas for small systems
Consider the linear system

which in matrix format is

Assume  nonzero. Then, with help of determinants,  and  can be found with Cramer's rule as

The rules for  matrices are similar.  Given

which in matrix format is

Differential geometry

Ricci calculus
Cramer's rule is used in the Ricci calculus in various calculations involving the Christoffel symbols of the first and second kind.

In particular, Cramer's rule can be used to prove that the divergence operator on a Riemannian manifold is invariant with respect to change of coordinates. We give a direct proof, suppressing the role of the Christoffel symbols.
Let  be a Riemannian manifold equipped with local coordinates . Let  be a vector field.  We use the summation convention throughout.

Theorem.

is invariant under change of coordinates.

Let  be a coordinate transformation with non-singular Jacobian.  Then the classical transformation laws imply that  where .  Similarly, if , then .  
Writing this transformation law in terms of matrices yields , which implies .

Now one computes

In order to show that this equals 
,
it is necessary and sufficient to show that 

which is equivalent to

Carrying out the differentiation on the left-hand side, we get:

But Cramer's Rule says that 

is the th entry of the matrix .
Thus

completing the proof.

Computing derivatives implicitly
When u and v are independent variables, we can define  and 

An equation for  can be found by applying Cramer's rule.

First, calculate the first derivatives of F, G, x, and y:

Substituting dx, dy into dF and dG, we have:

Since u, v are both independent, the coefficients of du, dv must be zero.  So we can write out equations for the coefficients:

Now, by Cramer's rule, we see that:

This is now a formula in terms of two Jacobians:

Similar formulas can be derived for

Integer programming
Cramer's rule can be used to prove that an integer programming problem whose constraint matrix is totally unimodular and whose right-hand side is integer, has integer basic solutions.  This makes the integer program substantially easier to solve.

Ordinary differential equations
Cramer's rule is used to derive the general solution to an inhomogeneous linear differential equation by the method of variation of parameters.

Geometric interpretation

Cramer's rule has a geometric interpretation that can be considered also a proof or simply giving insight about its geometric nature. These geometric arguments work in general and not only in the case of two equations with two unknowns presented here.

Given the system of equations

it can be considered as an equation between vectors

In general, when there are more variables and equations, the determinant of  vectors of length  will give the volume of the parallelepiped determined by those vectors in the -th dimensional Euclidean space.

Equating the areas of this last and the second parallelogram gives the equation

from which Cramer's rule follows.

Other proofs

A proof by abstract linear algebra 

This is a restatement of the proof above in abstract language.

Consider the map  where  is the matrix  with  substituted in the th column, as in Cramer's rule. Because of linearity of determinant in every column, this map is linear. Cramer's rule follows.

A short proof
A short proof of Cramer's rule  can be given by noticing that  is the determinant of the matrix

On the other hand, assuming that our original matrix  is invertible, this matrix  has columns , where  is the n-th column of the matrix . Recall that the matrix  has columns , and therefore . Hence, by using that the determinant of the product of two matrices is the product of the determinants,  we have

The proof for other  is similar.

Incompatible and indeterminate cases
A system of equations is said to be incompatible or inconsistent when there are no solutions and it is called indeterminate when there is more than one solution. For linear equations, an indeterminate system will have infinitely many solutions (if it is over an infinite field), since the solutions can be expressed in terms of one or more parameters that can take arbitrary values.

Cramer's rule applies to the case where the coefficient determinant is nonzero. In the 2×2 case, if the coefficient determinant is zero, then the system is incompatible if the numerator determinants are nonzero, or indeterminate if the numerator determinants are zero.

For 3×3 or higher systems, the only thing one can say when the coefficient determinant equals zero is that if any of the numerator determinants are nonzero, then the system must be incompatible. However, having all determinants zero does not imply that the system is indeterminate. A simple example where all determinants vanish (equal zero) but the system is still incompatible is the 3×3 system x+y+z=1, x+y+z=2, x+y+z=3.

See also
 Rouché–Capelli theorem
 Gaussian elimination

References

External links

 Proof of Cramer's Rule
 WebApp descriptively solving systems of linear equations with Cramer's Rule
 Online Calculator of System of linear equations
 Wolfram MathWorld explanation on this subject

Theorems in linear algebra
Determinants
1750 in science